Matt McKee is an American politician. He serves as a Republican member for the 6th district of the Arkansas Senate.

Life and career 
McKee was a justice of the peace in Garland County, Arkansas.

In May 2022, McKee defeated Bill Sample in the Republican primary election for the 6th district of the Arkansas Senate. In November 2022, he defeated Courtney McKee in the general election, winning 69 percent of the vote. He assumed office in 2023.

McKee made headlines in 2023 when he asked a transgender pharmacist if she has a penis.

References 

Living people
Place of birth missing (living people)
Year of birth missing (living people)
Republican Party Arkansas state senators
21st-century American politicians